Isabel Wünsche (born 1965 in Dresden) is a German art historian and Professor of Art and Art History at Jacobs University Bremen.

Biography 
Wünsche studied Art History, Classical and Christian Archeology at Humboldt University Berlin (1986–92), Moscow State University (1991–92), and Heidelberg University (1993–96). From 1993 to 1996, she was a Visiting Fellow at the Department of Slavic Languages and Literature and at the Institute of Modern Russian Culture of the University of Southern California in Los Angeles. In 1997, she completed her Ph.D. thesis on the Organic School of the Russian avant-garde and was awarded a PhD degree from Heidelberg University.

From 1993 to 2001, she lived and worked in Los Angeles. In 1995–96, she was a Curatorial Fellow at the Robert Gore Rifkind Center for German Expressionism of the Los Angeles County Museum of Art. As Curatorial Associate at the Norton Simon Museum in Pasadena, she worked, from 1997 to 2000, on the Catalogue Raisonné of the Galka Scheyer Blue Four Collection. In 2000–2001, she curated the permanent exhibition of twentieth-century American Art at the Huntington Library, Art Collections, and Botanical Gardens in San Marino. She also taught courses on modern art at the California Institute of Technology, Scripps College, Claremont, and the University of California, Los Angeles.

In 2001, Wünsche was appointed Associate Professor of Art and Art History at International University Bremen (since 2007 Jacobs University); in 2011, she was promoted to Full Professor.

Research groups and projects 
Her research area is art and art theory of the nineteenth to twenty-first centuries, particularly European modernism and the historic avant-garde movements, their reception beyond Europe, the role of artists’ networks and other forms of artistic exchange, the emergence and ideologization of abstract art, and interrelations between art, science and technology in modern and contemporary art.

Among the research projects and research groups she has organized are:

 The Russian Art & Culture Group]
 “German-Finnish Artistic Relations and Cultural Exchange in the 20th Century,” project-based exchange with Finland, funded by the German Academic Exchange Board (DAAD), 2019–2021
 “Bauhaus Australia: Émigrés, Refuges, and the Modernist Transformation of Education in Art, Architecture, and Design, 1930–1970” (with Philip Goad, University of Melbourne; Harriet Enquist, Royal Melbourne Institute of Technology; Andrew McNamara, Queensland University of Technology; Ann Stephen, University of Sydney), funded by the Australian Research Council (ARC), 2016–2019
 “Peripheral Expressionisms,” international research and publication project, funded by the Federal Government Commissioner for Culture and the Media (BKM), 2015–2017
 “German-Portuguese Artistic Relations in the Twentieth Century,” project-based exchange with Portugal, funded by the German Academic Exchange Board (DAAD), 2014–2015
 “Collaborative Artists’ Networks: Germany – Croatia,” project-based exchange with Croatia, funded by the German Academic Exchange Board (DAAD), 2014–2015
 “The Reception of German Modernism and the Bauhaus in Australian Art, Architecture, and Art Education between 1920 and 1960,” project-based exchange with Australia, funded by the German Academic Exchange Board (DAAD), 2012–2013
 “The Politics of Abstraction: Modernist Art and Visual Culture in the Globalized World,” funded by the German Science Foundation (DFG), 2011–12

Grants, fellowships and awards 
In 1990–1991, Wünsche received grants from the Walter Kaminsky Stiftung and from Moscow State University (MGU); from 1993 to 1996 she was a recipient of a three-year dissertation grant by the Gottlieb Daimler- und Karl Benz-Stiftung. Between 1999 and 2009, she was awarded travel grants by the International Research & Exchanges Board (IREX), the Society of Literature and Science (SLS), and the German Research Foundation (DFG). Wünsche has had fellowships with The Huntington Library, Art Collections, and Botanical Gardens in San Marino, California (2003–2004), the Nancy and Norton Dodge Collection of Nonconformist Art from the Soviet Union, the Zimmerli Art Museum at Rutgers, The State University of New Jersey (2003–2004, 2007), the National Humanities Center, North Carolina (2007–2008), the Institute for Advanced Study, Collegium Budapest (2008–2009), and New Europe College Institute for Advanced Study, Bukarest (2016). In 2021, she was selected as a scout by the Alexander von Humboldt Foundation for the Henriette Herz Scouting Program.

Major publications

Books 

 Galka E. Scheyer & Die Blaue Vier: Briefwechsel 1924–1945 (deutsche und englische Ausgabe, Bern: Benteli Verlag, 2006).
 
 Reviewed
 Kunst & Leben. Michail Matjuschin und die russische Avantgarde in St. Petersburg, Köln: Böhlau, 2012.

 Reviewed

Edited volumes 

 Reviewed

 Biocentrism and Modernism (with Oliver A. I. Botar, Farnham, UK: Ashgate, 2011; Paperback Edition, Routledge 2016).
 Meanings of Abstract Art: Between Nature and Theory (with Paul Crowther, London: Routledge, 2012; Paperback Edition 2016).
 Marianne Werefkin and the Women Artists in Her Circle (with Tanja Malycheva, Amsterdam: Brill/Rodopi, 2016).
 Practices of Abstract Art: Between Anarchism and Appropriation (with Wiebke Gronemeyer, Newcastle, UK: Cambridge Scholars Publishing, 2016).
 BAUHAUS DIASPORA: Transforming Education in Art, Architecture and Design (with Philip Goad, Ann Stephen, Andrew McNamara, Harriet Enquist, Melbourne: Melbourne University Press, 2019).

Special editions of journals 

 Isabel Wünsche, Galka Scheyer und die Blaue Vier, in Sonderdruck der Berner Kunstmitteilungen, Bern: Kunstmuseum Bern, 1997.
 Isabel Wünsche, Sebastian Borkhardt, Tanja Malycheva (eds.), “In Memoriam: Dmitry Vladimirovich Sarabyanov,” Experiment: A Journal of Russian Culture/Eksperiment: Zhurnal russkoi kultury, vol. 23 (2017)
 Ludmila Piters-Hofmann, Isabel Wünsche (eds.), issue on “Artistic Communities and Educational Approaches in Nineteenth- and Early Twentieth-Century Russia,” Russian History Russian History 46 (2019).

References

External links 

 Prof. Dr. Isabel Wünsche, Jacobs University
 Works by Isabel Wünsche in WorldCat Database
 Google Scholar: Isabel Wünsche
 Das Bauhaus in Australien (German)
 Eine Weltbürgerin, die Brücken zur Kunst baut (German)
 The Spread of Expressionism
 Attracting International Scientific Talent

1965 births
Living people
Heidelberg University alumni
Academic staff of Jacobs University Bremen